Gurmail Singh may refer to:

 Gurmail Singh (field hockey, born 1959), former Indian hockey player
 Gurmail Singh (field hockey, born 1992), Indian field hockey player who plays as a defender
 Gurmel Singh Dhillon song writer